See also article Kanefer (High Priest of Ptah).

Kanefer ("His Ka is beautiful") is the name of an ancient Egyptian prince. He lived during the 4th or early 5th Dynasty of the Old Kingdom period.

Identity 
According to Rainer Stadelmann and Michael Haase, Kanefer may have been a son of King Sneferu. Their assumption is based on the architectural features of Kanefer's tomb, which were rather typical for the beginning of the 4th dynasty. 

Next to nothing is known about his family, the name of his wife is lost due to damages on his tomb stela, but two of her titles, "female member of the elite" and "priestess of Hathor", are preserved. She bore several children to Kanefer – Kawab, Kanefer II and Meresankh.

Career 
Kanefer held the position of a vizier. He also was "son of the king", "member of the elite", "army general", "overseer of the commissions" and "leader of the royal archers".

Tomb 
Kanefer was interred in mastaba DAM 15 at Dahshur. In his tomb, heavily broken fragments of a doorslab stela were found.

References 

Princes of the Fourth Dynasty of Egypt
Viziers of the Fourth Dynasty of Egypt
Viziers of the Fifth Dynasty of Egypt
Sneferu
Princes of the Fifth Dynasty of Egypt